Aeroport is a metro station of Metrovalencia network situated west of Valencia, Spain. The station is located at Valencia Manises Airport, near Avinguda d'els Arcs and the adjacent bus terminal, making it a major access point towards the Valencia city center and Valencia port.

In the first 10 years since the station's opening, line 5 of Metrovalencia between Aeroport and Marítim-Serrería stations was used by 186.6 million passengers.

The metro stop opened in April 2007 as part of a ten-station extension which cost over 200 million euro. Originally, it formed part of metro zone B; however, in September 2012, it was moved to metro zone D, in order to maximise revenue. After the number of metro zones was reduced in 2022 Aeroport is the sole station in metro zone C.

References

Metrovalencia stations
Airport railway stations in Spain
Railway stations in Spain opened in 2007